Peter is a short story by Willa Cather. It was first published in The Mahogany Tree in 1892.

Plot summary
Peter Sadelack played second chair violin in Prague, and, despite losing his ability to play, continues to treasure his violin. His eldest son, Antone, tries to convince Peter to sell the violin. The story then describes his glamorous life back in Bohemia as he reminisces. After comparing his past and current lives, he attempts to play "Ave Maria", or Ellens dritter Gesang, on his violin. He cannot finish the song because of his shaking arm. Peter takes his violin to the stable and takes down Antone's gun. He breaks the violin and then shoots himself.

Antone finds his father frozen in the stable the next morning. He notices that his father forgot to break the bow, and he plans to sell it in town. Because Peter committed suicide outside in the cold, his body was unable to be straightened for a coffin; he is buried in a pine box instead.

Characters
Peter Sadelack, the main character of the short story. He was a second chair violinist in an orchestra in Prague. Despite tradition, he is not the master of his household. He likes to drink whiskey and reminisce about the past.
Antone, Peter's son. He is the master of the household, and he is very careful with his money and requires each family member to help run the household and farm.
Herr Mikilsdoff, an orchestra conductor in Prague in Peter's youth.
French woman, a singer from Peter's days in Bohemia. She was very beautiful and had a wonderful voice. Peter enjoyed watching her sing, even though he couldn't understand the words. He mentions her just before he kills himself.

Allusions to actual history
In his youth, Peter knew Marie d'Agoult, Franz Liszt, Sarah Bernhardt and Rachel.

Allusions to other works
Peter remembers seeing Sarah Bernhardt act in Victorien Sardou's La Tosca. He also mentions Franz Liszt, Frédéric Chopin and Ave Maria.

Criticism and significance
Peter was retouched and submitted for publication by her English professor, Herbert Bates, without her knowledge.

It has been argued that Peter reappeared in My Ántonia, with Mr Shimerda's suicide.

References

External links 
Original Publication at the Willa Cather Archive

1892 short stories
Short stories by Willa Cather
Works originally published in American magazines
Works originally published in literary magazines